The 1911 European Wrestling Championships were held in 1911 Budapest, Austria-Hungary. It was the first official European Championship in history. The participants competed only in Greco-Roman wrestling.

Medal table

Medal summary

Men's Greco-Roman

References

External links
FILA Database

1911 in European sport
Sports competitions in Budapest